Maria Chantal Videla (born December 15, 2002), known mononymously as Chanty is a Filipino-Argentine singer and actress who is a member of the South Korean girl group Lapillus.

Early life
Chanty was born in Manila, Philippines. Her father is Argentine while her mother is Filipino. Shortly after, her family moved to Mendoza, Argentina where she grew up with her younger sister. Later on, she moved back to the Philippines where she started her modelling and acting career.

Career

2018–2020: Career beginnings
On March 23, 2018, Chanty was introduced as one of the new stars under Star Magic Batch 2018, along with many young actors. She made her acting debut in the supernatural series Spirits: Reawaken as Gabbie, a teenage girl with mysterious superpowers. A year later, she played a major role in the 2019 Philippine film Familia Blondina, marking this as her big screen debut. Chanty also starred on ABS-CBN's television drama series Hiwaga ng Kambat and Starla.

2021–present: Lapillus, GMA Network

On November 26, 2021, Chanty was revealed as a trainee under MLD Entertainment. In 2022, MLD Entertainment officially announced that their upcoming girl group Lapillus is set to debut in June where she is confirmed to be one of the member. On May 25, her profile picture was revealed in Lapillus's official Twitter account.

On June 20, 2022, she debuted as a Lapillus member with the release of digital single "Hit Ya!". On November 11, Chanty transferred to GMA Network and signed an exclusive contract with Sparkle.

Filmography

Film

Television series

References

External links
 

Living people
2002 births
21st-century Filipino women singers
GMA Network personalities
Actresses from Manila
Argentine actresses
Argentine expatriates in South Korea
Argentine female models
Argentine people of Filipino descent
Filipino people of Argentine descent
Argentine television actresses
Filipino expatriates in South Korea
Filipino female models
Korean-language singers of the Philippines
People from Manila
People from Mendoza, Argentina